DJ Muggs vs. Ill Bill: Kill Devil Hills is a collaborative studio album by American Los Angeles-based record producer DJ Muggs and New York-based rapper Ill Bill. It was released on August 31, 2010 via Fat Beats, serving as Muggs' third album in his "DJ Muggs vs." series. Production was handled by DJ Muggs, except for two track produced by G. Rocka and DJ Khalil. It features guest appearances from B-Real, Sick Jacken, Chace Infinite, Everlast, O.C., Q-Unique, Raekwon, Slaine, Sean Price, Vinnie Paz and Uncle Howie. The album is dedicated to Ill Bill's uncle, Howard Tenebaum, who died five months before the record release. Kill Devil Hills peaked at number 86 on the Top R&B/Hip-Hop Albums, number 21 on the Top Rap Albums and number 17 on Heatseekers Albums charts in the United States, and also named one of 'Top 25 Albums of 2010' by HipHopDX.

Track listing

Personnel

 William Braunstein – main artist, rap vocals (tracks: 1–10, 12–16), executive producer
 Lawrence Muggerud – main artist, producer (tracks: 1–3, 5–10, 12–16), mixing, executive producer
 Gonzalo Alonzo Estrada – producer (track 4), drum programming (tracks: 12–13)
 Steve Ferlazzo – additional keyboards (tracks: 1, 4, 6–7, 9–10, 12–16)
 Jaymes Quirino – mastering
 Ernie "Ern Dog" Medina – recording
 Eric "Bobo" Correa – congas (track 10)
 Khalil Abdul-Rahman – producer (track 11)
 Joseph Abajian – executive producer
 Jeferson Fernandes – cover artwork
 Donna McLeer – graphics & layout
 Eden Braunstein – photography
 Jack Gonzales – featured artist (tracks: 2, 16)
 Louis Freese – featured artist (tracks: 5, 15)
 Anthony Quiles – featured artist (track 7), additional vocals (track 14)
 Omar Credle – featured artist (track 2)
 Sean Price – featured artist (track 2)
 Erik Schrody – featured artist (track 6)
 George Carroll – featured artist (track 6)
 Corey Woods – featured artist (track 10)
 Aaron Johnson – featured artist (track 13)
 Vincenzo Luvineri – featured artist (track 15)

Charts

References

External links

2010 albums
Ill Bill albums
Horrorcore albums
Collaborative albums
Fat Beats Records albums
Albums produced by DJ Muggs
Albums produced by DJ Khalil